Abdullah Mawei Al-Mutairi (born on 28 November 1995) is a Kuwaiti professional footballer who plays as a midfielder for Al-Qadsia  and the Kuwaiti national team.

He debuted internationally on 15 October 2018, in a friendly match against Australia in a 0–4 defeat.

On 5 September 2019, Mawei scored his first goal for Kuwait in a 2022 FIFA World Cup qualification match against Nepal in a 7–0 victory.

International goals 
.''Scores and result are list Kuwait's goal tally first.

References

External links
 

1995 births
Living people
Kuwaiti footballers
Kuwait international footballers
Association football midfielders
Al-Fahaheel FC players
Sportspeople from Kuwait City
Qadsia SC players
Kuwait Premier League players